Eudelphis is an extinct genus of sperm whale belonging to Physeteroidea that lived in the ancient North Sea basin about 16-11 million years ago, during the middle Miocene (Langhian).

Distribution  
The holotype of Eudelphis is known from the Langhian-age Berchem Formation of the vicinity of Antwerp, Belgium.

Taxonomy
Eudelphis was once considered a synonym of the genus Scaldicetus, but that genus is now considered of doubtful validity due to the questionably diagnostic value of the holotype tooth, and Lambert (2008) revalidated Eudelphis, classifying it as a basal physeteroid.

See also

Aulophyseter
Orycterocetus

References 

Prehistoric toothed whales
Miocene mammals of Europe
Miocene cetaceans
Prehistoric cetacean genera
Sperm whales